Yamini Singh (born 17 May 1996) is an Indian actress and model,  who appears mainly in Bhojpuri films. She made her Bhojpuri debut with 2019 film Patthar Ke Sanam with Arvind Akela Kallu and Awdhesh Mishra.

Early life and education
Yamini Singh was born 17 May 1996 in Lucknow of Uttar Pradesh to mother Sunita Singh. She received primary education from Rani Laxmi Bai Memorial Senior Secondary School. She attend Dr. D.Y. Patil College of Engineering, Pune and attained Engineering degree. She is also a fashion designer.

Career
Singh made her Bhojpuri debut with 2019 film Patthar Ke Sanam opposite Arvind Akela Kallu. She also appeared in Lallu Ki Laila with Dinesh Lal Yadav and Chhaliya with Arvind Akela Kallu.

Filmography

References

External links
 

Actresses in Bhojpuri cinema
21st-century Indian actresses
Indian film actresses
Living people
1996 births